Andreas Bloch (29 July 1860 – 11 May 1917) was a Norwegian painter, illustrator and costume designer.

Biography
Andreas Schroeter Schelver Bloch  was born on the Hellerud farm in Skedsmo, in Akershus county, Norway, as the son of Jens Peter Blankenborg Bloch (1817-1892) and Anne Julie Margrethe Schroeter (1827-1895). 

Andreas Bloch was a student at the art school of Knud Bergslien from 1878 until 1879. He studied at the Art Academy of Düsseldorf (Kunstakademie Düsseldorf) under Johann Peter Theodor Janssen from 1880 until 1881, and made study tours to Belgium, Paris and Leipzig.

Bloch is remembered primarily for his drawings. He delivered illustrations to the satirical magazines Vikingen, Krydseren and Korsaren, illustrated numerous books, and designed costumes for Christiania Theater and Nationaltheatret.  He  designed posters and theatrical costumes, as well as portraits. He designed the Coat of arms of Lillehammer.

He illustrated books by several Norwegian authors including works by children's author, Margrethe Aabel Munthe (Aase fiskerpike, 1912), by educator, Nordahl Rolfsen, (Vore fædres liv, 1898) works by adventurer Henrik August Angell (Vor sidste Krig 1807–1814, 1905) and author Jacob Breda Bull (Af Norges Frihedssaga, 1899 ). He delivered illustrations to Fridtjof Nansen's expedition books Paa ski over Grønland (on his Greenland expedition) and  Fram over Polhavet (Nansen's Fram expedition).

He also painted some historical subjects including the coronation of King Haakon VII of Norway and Queen Maud (Kong Haakon og Dronning Mauds kroning i Nidarosdomen, 1906) in Nidaros Cathedral.  His works are represented in both the National Gallery and in Oslo City Museum.

Personal life
He was married in 1890 to Ingeborg Elise Tellefsen (1869-1918). He died in Kristiania in 1917. Bloch was buried at Skedsmo Church.

Drawings by Andreas Bloch

References

1860 births
1917 deaths
People from Skedsmo
Norwegian illustrators
Norwegian caricaturists
19th-century Norwegian painters
19th-century Norwegian male artists
20th-century Norwegian painters
Norwegian male painters
Kunstakademie Düsseldorf alumni
20th-century Norwegian male artists